Ibrahima Lassana Diallo (born 24 June 1984) is a Malian former professional footballer who played as a striker.

Club career
Born in Bamako, Diallo began his career with Djoliba Athletic Club before moving to LB Châteauroux in 2003. In 2006 he returned to Mali and signed a contract with Stade Malien. In August 2007 went on trial with Algerian club MC Alger but did not do enough to impress the coach.

International career
Diallo was part of the Mali U-17 national team which finished third in the group stage of 2001 FIFA U-17 World Championship. He played his first game for the Mali senior team on 9 July 2007 against Sierra Leone.

References

1984 births
Living people
Sportspeople from Bamako
Association football forwards
Malian footballers
Mali international footballers
Ligue 2 players
LB Châteauroux players
Djoliba AC players
Stade Malien players
Malian expatriate footballers
Malian expatriate sportspeople in France
Expatriate footballers in France
21st-century Malian people